Erin Zaman is a Bangladeshi actress, singer and television anchor.

Biography
Erin Zaman is Moushumi's younger sister. She made her debut in Dhallywood with অনন্ত ভালোবাসা (Everlasting Love), where Shakib Khan was her co-star, which was also debut film of Shakib Khan. She acted in television dramas too.

Her first album was Modhurat which was released before অনন্ত ভালোবাসা (Everlasting Love). In 2008 her second album Tomay Dekhbo Chhuye was released and in 2014 her third album Chaile Tumi was released. She also worked as television host. She is now living in Atlanta, USA.

Selected filmography
 Ananta Bhalobasha as Jyoti (1999)
 Hridoy Amar Nam
 Meher Negar
 Dojjal Shashuri
 Shreshtho Sontan
 Ulta Palta 69

Album list
 Modhurat
 Tomay Dekhbo Chhuye
 Chaile Tumi

References

Bangladeshi film actresses
Bangladeshi television actresses
Living people
Bangladeshi women television presenters
21st-century Bangladeshi women singers
21st-century Bangladeshi singers
Year of birth missing (living people)
People from Khulna
People from Khulna District